Spiroctenus is a genus of African araneomorph spiders in the family Bemmeridae. It was first described by Eugène Louis Simon in 1889. Originally placed with the Ctenizidae, it was transferred to the funnel-web trapdoor spiders in 1985, and to the Bemmeridae in 2020. It is a senior synonym of Bemmeris, Bessia, and Ctenonemus.

Species
 it contains thirty species, all found in southern Africa:
Spiroctenus armatus Hewitt, 1913 – South Africa
Spiroctenus broomi Tucker, 1917 – South Africa
Spiroctenus cambierae (Purcell, 1902) – South Africa
Spiroctenus coeruleus Lawrence, 1952 – South Africa
Spiroctenus collinus (Pocock, 1900) – South Africa
Spiroctenus curvipes Hewitt, 1919 – South Africa
Spiroctenus exilis Lawrence, 1938 – South Africa
Spiroctenus flavopunctatus (Purcell, 1903) – South Africa
Spiroctenus fossorius (Pocock, 1900) – South Africa
Spiroctenus fuligineus (Pocock, 1902) – South Africa
Spiroctenus gooldi (Purcell, 1903) – South Africa
Spiroctenus inermis (Purcell, 1902) – South Africa
Spiroctenus latus Purcell, 1904 – South Africa
Spiroctenus lightfooti (Purcell, 1902) – South Africa
Spiroctenus lignicola Lawrence, 1937 – South Africa
Spiroctenus londinensis Hewitt, 1919 – South Africa
Spiroctenus marleyi Hewitt, 1919 – South Africa
Spiroctenus minor (Hewitt, 1913) – South Africa
Spiroctenus pallidipes Purcell, 1904 – South Africa
Spiroctenus pardalina (Simon, 1903) – South Africa
Spiroctenus pectiniger (Simon, 1903) – South Africa
Spiroctenus personatus Simon, 1888 (type) – Southern Africa
Spiroctenus pilosus Tucker, 1917 – South Africa
Spiroctenus punctatus Hewitt, 1916 – South Africa
Spiroctenus purcelli Tucker, 1917 – South Africa
Spiroctenus sagittarius (Purcell, 1902) – South Africa
Spiroctenus schreineri (Purcell, 1903) – South Africa
Spiroctenus spinipalpis Hewitt, 1919 – South Africa
Spiroctenus tricalcaratus (Purcell, 1903) – South Africa
Spiroctenus validus (Purcell, 1902) – South Africa

Nomen dubium
S. lusitanus Franganillo, 1920

See also
 List of Bemmeridae species

References

Further reading

Araneomorphae genera
Bemmeridae
Spiders of South Africa